Mehravan Rural District is a rural district (dehestan) in the Central District of Neka County, Mazandaran Province, Iran. At the 2006 census, its population was 10,884, in 2,681 families. The rural district has 18 villages.

References 

Rural Districts of Mazandaran Province
Neka County